United Nations Security Council resolution 2518 was adopted in 2020.

See also
 List of United Nations Security Council Resolutions 2501 to 2600 (2019–2021)

References

External links
Text of the Resolution at undocs.org

 2518
March 2020 events